Charles Thomas Fuchs (November 18, 1913 – June 10, 1969) was a Major League Baseball pitcher for the Detroit Tigers (1942), Philadelphia Phillies (1943), St. Louis Browns (1943), and Brooklyn Dodgers (1944). The ,  left-hander was a native of Union Hill, New Jersey (now part of Union City, New Jersey).

Fuchs is one of many ballplayers who only appeared in the major leagues during World War II. Making his major league debut in relief on April 17, 1942, against the St. Louis Browns at Sportsman's Park, his first major league win came just two days later. He started the second game of a doubleheader against the same St. Louis Browns and pitched a 1–0 complete game shutout.

In three seasons Fuchs appeared in a total of 47 games and had a 6–10 record, 13 starts, 5 complete games, 2 shutouts, 13 games finished, and 1 save.  He allowed 90 earned runs in 165 innings pitched for a final ERA of 4.89. He was not a good hitter (3-for-43...an .070 batting average), but he was a competent fielder, handling 50 of 52 total chances successfully for a fielding percentage of .962.

Fuchs died at the age of 56 in Weehawken, New Jersey.

References

External links

Major League Baseball pitchers
Baseball players from New Jersey
Detroit Tigers players
Philadelphia Phillies players
St. Louis Browns players
Brooklyn Dodgers players
1912 births
1969 deaths
Richmond Colts players
South Boston-Halifax Wrappers players
Oklahoma City Indians players
Beaumont Exporters players
Buffalo Bisons (minor league) players
Montreal Royals players
Nyack Rocklands players
Sportspeople from Union City, New Jersey